Milija Brkić (born 23 October 1954) is a Serbian retired professional footballer who played from the early 1970s to early 1990s. After retiring he served as a manager for numerous different clubs but is currently unattached to a team.

Playing career
Born in Bor, Serbia, Socialist Federal Republic of Yugoslavia, Brkić started playing with his hometown club Bor, and made his senior debut in 1977.

Brkić played from 1978 to 1983 in FK Zemun spending several seasons in Yugoslav First League appearing in games against best clubs in Yugoslavia, such as FK Partizan, Red Star, Dinamo Zagreb, Hajduk Split, Vojvodina, among others. He also played for six years at Bor in the second tier football league of Yugoslavia.

International career
Brkić played four matches for Yugoslavia at the Nehru Cup in 1982. The coach of that team was the legendary Miljan Miljanić, a former manager of Real Madrid.

Managerial career

Brkić began his managerial career in 1991 for his parent club Bor, spending several years as a coach of the first team in the Yugoslav Second League. He was also a coach of Zemun in First League of Serbia and Montenegro. For his second term, he replaced Dragan Lacmanović.

In 2010 Brkić came back to his original club, Bor, trying to help his former club return to the old way of success. Unfortunately, bad finance situations in the club impacted their season, making it very turbulent.

After a few years of break, Brkić decided to accept an offer to manage FK Budućnost Arilje, where he lived, and to help them to achieve placement in the Drina Zone League. They succeeded, without a single recorded loss in season. However, Brkić declined to extend his contract with the club.

References

1954 births
Living people
People from Bor, Serbia
Yugoslav footballers
Association football forwards
Yugoslav First League players
FK Zemun players
FK Bor players
Serbian football managers
FK Bor managers
FK Zemun managers
Serbian SuperLiga managers
Serbian expatriate football managers